The 1972 Southern Miss Golden Eagles football team was an American football team that represented the University of Southern Mississippi as an independent during the 1972 NCAA University Division football season. In their fourth year under head coach P. W. Underwood, the team compiled a 3–7–1 record.

Schedule

References

Southern Miss
Southern Miss Golden Eagles football seasons
Southern Miss Golden Eagles football